Tracy Beaker Returns is a British television programme. Based upon the novels by Jacqueline Wilson, it is the sequel series to The Story of Tracy Beaker. The series stars Dani Harmer reprising her role as protagonist Tracy Beaker. The third and final series ended on 23 March 2012. A sequel spin-off entitled The Dumping Ground started airing on 4 January 2013.

Premise
When author Tracy Beaker is arrested for using her adoptive mother Cam's credit card to publish her autobiography, she seeks refuge at Elmtree House, a care home nicknamed "The Dumping Ground" where she used to live as a child. She meets the children who are intrigued by her and her story. Wanting to pay Cam back, Tracy asks the head care worker, Mike (Connor Byrne), for a job. As Mike is short-staffed, he agrees to hire her as an assistant care worker since she knows so much about life in care. Tracy then uses her background as a former child in care to become fully involved in the children's lives.

Production
 
The first series was produced in summer 2009, then provisionally known Beaker's Back. Set designers revamped buildings of the former La Sagesse convent school in the Jesmond area of Newcastle-upon-Tyne into the children's home, retaining the Elm Tree House name from series 5 of The Story of Tracy Beaker. The father's house was developed into the exterior of Elm Tree House, whilst the show's interior scenes were filmed in a grander building elsewhere on the same site. Classroom buildings and the Jesmond Towers were also used for scenes, as well as local landmarks such as the MetroCentre shopping centre. Production continued at La Sagesse through series two and three and into the first series of The Dumping Ground until property owners Barratt Homes decided to redevelop the school buildings into a luxury housing estate. The recognisable exterior of Elm Tree House was demolished in mid-2013 though the building used for interior scenes partially remains intact.

Episodes

Cast and characters

Ratings
Episode ratings from BARB.

Development and production
In March 2009, the BBC announced the new 13-part series under the working title Beaker's Back!. The series was filmed in the old La Sagesse School in Jesmond, Newcastle upon Tyne in the summer of 2009, and directed by Neasa Hardiman, Craig Lines and Michael Davies.

In February 2010, it was announced that Tracy Beaker Returns would be renewed for a second series to air in 2011. Filming took place throughout summer and autumn of 2010 and premiered on 7 January 2011.

It was announced on 12 March 2011 that a third series has been commissioned to be filmed entirely in the North East. The third series later premiered on 6 January 2012.

A spin-off series has been commissioned by the CBBC, titled The Dumping Ground and started airing on 4 January 2013.

Awards and nominations
It won the Children's BAFTA award on 28 November 2010 for best drama. On the same night, Dani Harmer and Richard Wisker received nominations in the performer category. It also won a Royal Television Award in 2011, in the Children's Drama Category.

Notes

References

External links
 

2010s British children's television series
2010 British television series debuts
2012 British television series endings
CBBC shows
BBC children's television shows
British children's drama television series
The Story of Tracy Beaker
Tracy Beaker series
Television shows set in Newcastle upon Tyne
Television series about orphans
Television series about children
Television series about teenagers
British teen drama television series
Television series by BBC Studios